Boys Ranch Independent School District is a public school district in Oldham County, Texas (USA).

Finances
The Boys Ranch School District serves Cal Farley's Boys Ranch, a facility for at-risk boys and girls primarily from the local area, but also for youth around the world. Boys Ranch is a non-profit entity. Unlike other Texas school districts, Boys Ranch has no taxable base. Instead, Boys Ranch relies on donor contributions.

As of the 2010-2011 school year, the appraised valuation of property in the district was $0. The maintenance tax rate was $0.000 and the bond tax rate was $0.000 per $100 of appraised valuation.

Academic achievement
In 2011, the school district was rated "academically unacceptable" by the Texas Education Agency.  Six percent of districts in Texas in 2011 received the same rating. No state accountability ratings will be given to districts in 2012. A school district in Texas can receive one of four possible rankings from the Texas Education Agency: Exemplary (the highest possible ranking), Recognized, Academically Acceptable, and Academically Unacceptable (the lowest possible ranking).

Historical district TEA accountability ratings
2011: Academically Unacceptable
2010: Academically Acceptable
2009: Academically Acceptable
2008: Academically Acceptable
2007: Academically Acceptable
2006: Academically Acceptable
2005: Academically Acceptable
2004: Academically Acceptable

Schools
In the 2011-2012 school year, the district operated four schools.
Regular instructional
Boys Ranch High School (Grades 9-12)
Blakemore Middle (Grades 6-8)
Mimi Farley Elementary (Grades K-5)
Alternative instructional
STARR Academy (Grades 2-12)

Boys Ranch the institution includes a boarding program.

Special programs

Athletics
Boys Ranch High School participates in the boys sports of baseball, basketball, football, and wrestling. The school participates in the girls sport of basketball. For the 2012 through 2014 school years, Boys Ranch High School will play football in UIL Class 2A Division II. The school football team made its first ever playoff appearance in 2008. The school cross country team has never lost a district title since it picked up the program in 1981. It has also won 8 state titles and 10+ state runners-up.

See also

List of school districts in Texas
List of high schools in Texas
List of boarding schools in the United States
Randolph Academy Union Free School District - A school district including residential institutions in New York State
Masonic Home Independent School District - A former school district including an institution in Fort Worth

References

External links
Boys Ranch ISD

School districts in Oldham County, Texas